Copa Centro-Oeste was a Brazilian football competition contested between Center-West region teams and teams from the Southeastern State Espírito Santo. For one edition, it was also contested by teams from Minas Gerais.  

Minas Gerais state clubs only competed in the first Copa Centro-Oeste edition, in 1999, joining the new Copa Sul-Minas in 2000. Cruzeiro, from Minas Gerais, won the Cup and was the only non-Central Western team to reach the finals in the four editions of the tourney.

From 2000 to 2002, the Copa Centro-Oeste champions granted qualification to the Copa dos Campeões.

List of champions

Performances

By club

By state

Similar competitions
The Copa Brasil Central was held in 1967 and 1969, while the Torneio Centro-Oeste was held in 1976, 1981 and in 1984. The 1976 edition was organized by the CBD.

List of champions

References

External links
RSSSF

Centro-Oeste